Ebolowa is the capital of Cameroon's South Region. It has a population of 79,500 (2001 estimate). It is a colonial town and a notable agricultural centre.

Overview 

The main crop is cocoa. It also hosts an important number of administrative services, being the capital of both the South Region and the Mvila département.

Tarred roads link Ebolowa to Mbalmayo and Ambam.

Accident 

On Sunday, May 6, 2007, the search for the wreckage of Kenya Airways Flight 507 began to focus on the area around Ebolowa.  En route from Abidjan, Côte d'Ivoire, to Nairobi, Kenya, Flight KQ 507 took off at 00:05 local time on Saturday (23:05 GMT Friday) after a stop in Douala, Cameroon.  The flight was scheduled to reach Nairobi at 06:15 local time (03:15 GMT) but a distress signal was received shortly after its takeoff from Douala.

Gallery

See also
Communes of Cameroon

References 

Populated places in South Region (Cameroon)
Provincial capitals in Cameroon